The Samuel Taylor Suit Cottage, also known as the Berkeley Castle or Berkeley Springs Castle, is located on a hill above Berkeley Springs, West Virginia, United States.

History
The castle-like house was built for Colonel Samuel Taylor Suit of Washington, D.C. as a personal retreat near the spa town, beginning in 1885. It was not complete by the time of his death in 1888 and was finished in the early 1890s for his young widow, Rosa Pelham Suit, whom Suit had first met at Berkeley Springs, and their three children. The post 1888 work is of noticeably inferior quality.

The design is attributed to Washington architect Alfred B. Mullett, who is alleged to have drawn a rough sketch of the plan on a tablecloth at the Berkeley Springs Hotel. The design may have been based on elements of Berkeley Castle in Gloucestershire, United Kingdom. Detailed design and construction supervision was carried out by Snowden Ashford, who designed Washington's Eastern Market, apprenticed for Mullett and is also credited as an architect. Mrs. Suit entertained lavishly at the house until her money ran out and the property was sold in 1913.

Purchase by the VDare Foundation 
In February 2020, the property was purchased by the VDARE Foundation, a tax-exempt affiliate of anti-immigration organization VDARE, which publishes writings by white nationalists.

The purchase was met with resistance from residents and leaders in Berkeley Springs.

VDARE founder and editor Peter Brimelow stated "We absolutely will not be having rallies, marches or demonstrations. We've never been involved in anything like that, and we never will be," and "We just want to be quiet, good neighbors.  "The only public events we're anticipating right now are the local charitable functions that we understand the castle has traditionally hosted. We hope to have some private meetings and functions, but don't have plans for any public VDARE events."  VDARE purchased the house for $1.4 million and the source of the money is unknown.

In popular culture 
Berkeley Springs, including the Samuel Taylor Suit Cottage, inspired a location in the online multiplayer game Fallout 76.

References

External links
 Atlas Obscura: Berkeley Springs Castle Berkeley Springs, West Virginia A wealthy widow lived the high life in this Gilded Age country house.  
 Andrew Gosline, Owner of Berkeley Springs Castle, Dies at 74
 Berkeley Castle Living in a Landmark (an interview with former owner Andrew Gosline)
	 

Bath (Berkeley Springs), West Virginia
Castles in West Virginia
Houses completed in 1891
Houses in Morgan County, West Virginia
Houses on the National Register of Historic Places in West Virginia
National Register of Historic Places in Morgan County, West Virginia
Stone houses in West Virginia
Victorian architecture in West Virginia